William Selby (died c. 1426), of York, was an English Member of Parliament.

He was a Member (MP) of the Parliament of England for City of York in February 1383, April 1384, 1391, 1395 and January 1397. He was Mayor of York 3 February 1385–6, 1387–9.

References

14th-century births
1420s deaths
14th-century English people
People from York
Members of the Parliament of England (pre-1707)
Year of birth unknown
Year of death uncertain